Nils Adolf Andersson (10 March 1887 – 15 August 1947) was a Swedish footballer who played as a defender. He competed in the men's tournament at the 1908 Summer Olympics.

References

External links
 

  (archive)
 

1887 births
1947 deaths
Footballers from Gothenburg
Association football defenders
Swedish footballers
IFK Göteborg players
Sweden international footballers
Olympic footballers of Sweden
Footballers at the 1908 Summer Olympics